The 2009–10 season was Cardiff City F.C.'s 83rd season in The Football League since joining in 1920. The season was also the club's first in the Cardiff City Stadium, replacing their former ground Ninian Park, which had been used by the club for 99 years. Cardiff had their most successful season in the Football League Championship finishing 4th making the play-offs for the Premier League. Cardiff narrowly missed out on promotion after losing 3–2 to Blackpool in the Final.

Events
26 June 2009 – Cardiff City pen a five-year kit manufacturing deal with Puma.
4 July 2009 – Cardiff City break their record transfer fee with the £3 million signing of Michael Chopra from Sunderland.
22 July 2009 – Cardiff City Stadium is officially opened with a 0–0 draw against with Celtic.
7 August 2009 – Mark Hudson is named club captain.
11 September 2009 – Cardiff City agree a one-year shirt sponsorship deal with 777ball.com. 
28 September 2009 – SBOBET are announced as replacement sponsors following the withdrawal of 777ball.com due to licensing problems.
7 November 2009 – Dave Jones receives Championship Manager of the Month for October.
14 November 2009 – Peter Whittingham receives Player of the Month for October.
20 November 2009 – Midfielder Stephen McPhail is diagnosed with stage one lymphoma, a rare form of cancer.
25 November 2009 – Datuk Chan Tien Ghee is appointed on the board of directors.
28 November 2009 – Goalkeeper Peter Enckelman is involved in a car crash but made a "luck escape" playing 45 mins the following day.
4 December 2009 – Club secretary, Jason Turner is suspended.
11 December 2009 – Cardiff City agree a settlement with Langston Corporation, over taking any more legal action over the clubs debt.
17 December 2009 – Riccardo Scimeca is forced to retire at the age of 34 due to injury.
29 January 2010 – Captain Mark Hudson is ruled out for 10–12 weeks with a split ankle tendon.
9 April 2010 – Gavin Rae is confirmed to be out for the season with a ruptured tendon in his ankle.

Football League Championship

Standings

Results summary

Results by round

Kit

|
|
|
|
|
|

Squad

Statistics

|}
 * Indicates player left club during the season.

Captains

Disciplinary record

Contracts

Transfers

In

 Total spent:  ~ £5,250,750

Loans In

Out

 Total income:  ~ £5,300,000

Loans out

Fixtures & results

Pre-season friendlies

League

Play-offs

FA Cup

Football League Cup

Overall summary

Summary

Aggregate Scores

Backroom staff

Awards

Team
Football League Championship Play-Offs: Runners-Up

Individual
 October Championship manager of the month: Dave Jones
 October Championship player of the month: Peter Whittingham
 Football League Championship Apprentice of the Year: Adam Matthews
PFA Team of the Year: Peter Whittingham, Michael Chopra
Football League Championship top-goalscorer: Peter Whittingham (20 goals) (joint with Bristol City's Nicky Maynard)

See also
Cardiff City F.C. seasons
2009–10 Football League Championship
2009–10 FA Cup
2009–10 Football League Cup

References

2009-10
Welsh football clubs 2009–10 season
2009–10 Football League Championship by team